Philipp Eng (born 28 February 1990 in Salzburg) is an Austrian professional racing driver, and BMW Motorsport works driver.

Career

Karting
Eng started karting in 2003, by competing in Intercontinental A Junior karts, competing in the Andrea Margutti Trophy and the Italian Open Masters. Eng finished 18th in the Margutti Trophy, leading home Marco Wittmann, while he finished 30th in the Italian Open Masters. Eng continued at JICA level in 2004, finishing seventh in the Margutti Trophy, and 31st in the European Championship. One highlight however was that Eng won the Italian Open Masters, holding off Wittmann again by five points. He moved to ICA level in 2005, but only contested the Italian Championship and the Open Masters. Eng finished in the top ten of both series, ranking ninth in the Open Masters and tenth in the Italian Championship.

Formula BMW
Eng made his car racing debut for ADAC Berlin-Brandenburg in the Formula BMW ADAC series in 2006. Eng finished tenth in the championship and runner-up behind Jens Klingmann in the Rookie Cup, with a podium coming at the third round at Lausitz. He also competed in a solitary round of the British series for Carlin Motorsport at Silverstone. He finished fourteenth in the second race, having retired from the first. Eng continued in the ADAC series in 2007, and would go on to finish third in the championship behind the Eifelland Racing cars of Klingmann and Daniel Campos-Hull who took twelve of the eighteen race wins between them. Eng did take one win at Barcelona but only after Klingmann was given a ten-second penalty for dangerous driving.

Eng did make up for this in some aspects by winning the end of season World Final from pole position. Having switched to Mücke Motorsport, Eng dominated the race before leading home Wittmann, Klingmann and Sebastián Saavedra. Eng completed his FBMW career by driving for Mücke in the inaugural season of the Formula BMW Europe championship. As he was a guest driver, he was ineligible to score points. His best finish came at Spa, when he finished fourth in a wet race.

Formula Three
Eng competed in four rounds of the 2008 German Formula Three season with HS Technik at the season-opening round at Hockenheim, and also with Ombra Racing at the season-closing round at Oschersleben. Eng finished eleventh in the championship, including a third-place finish at Oschersleben, and a pole and fastest lap coming at Hockenheim.

FIA Formula Two
2009 saw Eng move up to the FIA Formula Two Championship, driving car number 33.

Eng had a tests in GP2 Series for Ocean Racing Technology, but remained in Formula Two for 2010. On the second race of the opening round at Silverstone Circuit, he started from pole and took his second win. He scored a further two wins, improving his championship position to sixth.

ADAC GT Masters
Eng switched to sports car racing for 2011, competing in the German-based ADAC GT Masters series.

Deutsche Tourenwagen Masters
Eng switched to touring car racing for 2018, competing in the German-based Deutsche Tourenwagen Masters series with BMW Team RBM.

Racing record

Career summary

† As Eng was a guest driver, he was ineligible to score points.
* Season still in progress.

Complete FIA Formula Two Championship results
(key) (Races in bold indicate pole position) (Races in italics indicate fastest lap)

Complete Porsche Supercup results
(key) (Races in bold indicate pole position) (Races in italics indicate fastest lap)

‡ Eng was a guest driver, therefore he was ineligible for points.

Complete Blancpain GT Series Sprint Cup results

Complete 24 Hours of Le Mans results

Complete IMSA SportsCar Championship results
(key) (Races in bold indicate pole position; races in italics indicate fastest lap)

* Season still in progress.

Complete Deutsche Tourenwagen Masters results
(key) (Races in bold indicate pole position) (Races in italics indicate fastest lap)

Complete FIA World Endurance Championship results
(key) (Races in bold indicate pole position; races in italics indicate fastest lap)

References

External links

 

1990 births
Living people
Sportspeople from Salzburg
Austrian racing drivers
FIA Formula Two Championship drivers
German Formula Three Championship drivers
Formula BMW ADAC drivers
Formula BMW UK drivers
FIA Institute Young Driver Excellence Academy drivers
Blancpain Endurance Series drivers
Porsche Supercup drivers
ADAC GT Masters drivers
24 Hours of Spa drivers
24 Hours of Le Mans drivers
24 Hours of Daytona drivers
WeatherTech SportsCar Championship drivers
Deutsche Tourenwagen Masters drivers
FIA World Endurance Championship drivers
BMW M drivers
Mücke Motorsport drivers
Carlin racing drivers
Ombra Racing drivers
Rowe Racing drivers
Schnitzer Motorsport drivers
Racing Bart Mampaey drivers
Rahal Letterman Lanigan Racing drivers
Porsche Motorsports drivers
Nürburgring 24 Hours drivers
Boutsen Ginion Racing drivers
Porsche Carrera Cup Germany drivers
W Racing Team drivers